The Chona (Çuona) is a river in the Sakha Republic (Yakutia) and Irkutsk Oblast, Russia.

The Russian Geographical Society organized an expedition in 1853–55 to survey the orography, geology and population of the Vilyuy and Chona basins.

Course 
It flows roughly northeastwards forming rapids which make the river not navigable. The lowest  of its course were flooded by the Vilyuy Reservoir after the Vilyuy Dam was built in 1967. The river freezes between October and late May.

The main tributaries of the Chona are the Vakunayka on the right and the Dekimde on the left. There are no permanent settlements by the Chona.

See also
List of rivers of Russia

References

External links
Geography - Yakutia Organized

Rivers of Irkutsk Oblast
Rivers of the Sakha Republic